Law of Washington may refer to:

 Law of Washington (state)
 Law of Washington, D.C.